{{Infobox government agency
| type            = 
| seal            = 
| seal_caption    = 
| logo            = 
| logo_caption    = 
| formed          = April 2007
| preceding1      = Premier's Department of New South Wales
| preceding2      = The Cabinet Office (NSW)
| dissolved       = 
| jurisdiction    = New South Wales
| headquarters    = 52 Martin Place, Sydney, New South Wales, Australia
| coordinates     = 
| employees       = 687 (2010)
| budget          = 
| minister1_name  = 
| minister1_pfo   = 
| minister2_name  = Ben Franklin 
| minister2_pfo   = 
| minister3_name  = 
| minister3_pfo   = 
| minister4_name  = 
| minister4_pfo   = 
| minister5_name  = 
The New South Wales Department of Premier and Cabinet (DPC), a department of the New South Wales Government, is responsible for leading the New South Wales public sector to deliver on the Government's commitments and priorities. The department provides administrative support that enables the cabinet to identify, design and implement a coordinated policy, project and reform agenda that boosts the efficiency, productivity and effectiveness across the State. The department consults and work closely with other New South Wales government departments, the Commonwealth Government, local government, business and the community to ensure responses to community needs are effective.

The Department is led by its Secretary, presently Michael Coutts-Trotter, who reports to the Premier, presently Dominic Perrottet and in his absence, the Deputy Premier, presently Paul Toole, since 6 October 2021. The Premier is assisted in administration of the portfolio by the Minister for Aboriginal Affairs, the Minister for the Arts, and the Minister for Regional Youth, currently the Hon. Ben Franklin , since 21 December 2021.

Agency activities
The Department of Premier and Cabinet is directly responsible for the administration and implementation of government reform agenda through policy and project support. The department also plays a key coordinating role in disaster management, delivery of infrastructure such as major projects and industry and business development. Premier and Cabinet also manages workforce reforms, employee relations and essential services to support the government of the day, such as ministerial services, parliamentary counsel, cabinet secretariat and policy support.

The Department is responsible for investigating various matters as directed by the Premier and the agency Secretary.

Current structural groups and divisions
, the Department of Premier and Cabinet is divided into five groups: the Strategy and Delivery Group; the Transformation Group; the Community Engagement Group; Office of the General Counsel; and the People Group. Each group comprises a number of branches (in the People Group, teams). These groups are responsible for a number of functional areas, agencies and cabinet committees. 

The five branches of the Community Engagement Group are: Employee Relations; Aboriginal Affairs NSW; Create NSW; Heritage NSW; State Archives Records Authority (SARA); and the Sydney Living Museums. Heritage NSW will be transferred to the Department of Planning and Environment on 1 April 2022.

Premier and Cabinet cluster
NSW Government agencies are broadly organised into eight groups, referred to as clusters. The following agencies are included in the Premier and Cabinet cluster, administered by the Department:

Executive agencies

 Office of the Governor
 Art Gallery of New South Wales
 Australian Museum
 Election Funding Authority of New South Wales
 Greater Sydney Commission
 Heritage Council of New South Wales
 Independent Commission Against Corruption
 Independent Pricing and Regulatory Tribunal
 Infrastructure NSW
 Library Council of New South Wales
 Museum of Applied Arts and Sciences
 Natural Resources Commission
 New South Wales Electoral Commission
 New South Wales Ombudsman
 Office of the Inspector of the Law Enforcement Conduct Commission
 Parliamentary Counsel's Office
 Public Service Commission
 Resilience NSW
 Sydney Opera House Trust

Non-executive agencies

 Aboriginal Affairs NSW
 Create NSW (incorporating the previous Arts NSW and Screen NSW)

Agency history
In 2006 the New South Wales Government commissioned an inquiry into government administration by Dr Michael Vertigan  and Nigel Stokes, entitled New South Wales audit of expenditure and assets report or more commonly the Vertigan Report.

Prior to 2007 separate agencies existed, entitled the Premier's Department of New South Wales and the New South Wales Cabinet Office, the latter established in 1988. Premier Morris Iemma merged the two agencies into the new Department of Premier and Cabinet under the direction of Robyn Kruk after the 2006 resignation of the Director General of the  Cabinet Office, Roger Wilkins, and replacing the long-term Director General of Premier's Department, Col Gellatly, who served under Premier Carr.

In 2008, following the resignation of Premier Iemma, Nathan Rees replaced Kruk with John Lee, a senior public servant in the New South Wales Department of Transport and brother of Michael Lee, a former Labor Federal Minister and Councillor of the City of Sydney. In June 2009, Rees announced a restructure of the New South Wales Government and the creation of 13 super departments aimed at delivering better government services. The Department of Premier and Cabinet was named as the lead agency; responsible for the implementation of the new plan. Additionally, the Department of Premier and Cabinet became responsible to a number of Ministers. In addition to the Premier, the Ministers for the Central Coast, the Hunter, the Illawarra, Infrastructure, Local Government, Police, Public Sector Reform, Regulatory Reform, Women, and the Assisting the Premier on Veterans’ Affairs, and the Special Minister of State all were responsible for various functions administered by the Department of Premier and Cabinet. Following the December 2009 appointment of Kristina Keneally as Premier, Keneally announced that the restructure plan would continue to be implemented, whilst at the same time replacing Lees with Brendan O'Reilly.

Following the NSW coalition's victory at the 2011 state election, Liberal Premier Barry O'Farrell replaced O'Reilly with Chris Eccles on 4 April 2011. By August 2011, a revised agency structure was formalised, together with an overlying management structure that led to the creation of offices and divisions covering local government, planning and infrastructure including strategic lands, environment and heritage including environment and climate change, national parks and wildlife, western Sydney, parliamentary counsel, and general counsel. A further restructure took place following the 2015 state election when Premier Mike Baird transferred the functions of investment attraction, trade and tourism, and major events from the Trade and Industry to Premier and Cabinet. Minor changes to the portfolio were made following the 2019 state election when the number of clusters were reduced from ten to eight.

Agency executives

Premier's Department

Premier & Cabinet

Agency inquiries
In 2007, the Director General of the Department referred a matter to NSW Police following allegation that Paul Gibson had allegedly assaulted Sandra Nori, a parliamentary colleague of Gibson's with whom he had a relationship. In 2010, the Department coordinated investigations into claims that Ian Macdonald, a disgraced former Minister, had rorted his travel allowances. During 2010, the Auditor General of New South Wales accused the agency of establishing special deals with contracted public servants which resulted in them receiving a form of golden handshake. Premier Keneally defended the Department and stated that, "nobody in my government has those sorts of arrangements".

See also

 New South Wales Government
 Premier of New South Wales

References

External links
Department of Premier and Cabinet

Premier and Cabinet
2007 establishments in Australia
Government agencies established in 2007